Mount Laguna is a small census-designated place (CDP) in San Diego County, California. The hamlet sits at the high point of a scenic drive on Sunrise Highway  from Interstate 8 to Highway 79. Mount Laguna is on the Pacific Crest Trail. Mount Laguna consists of a small general store, rustic lodge and cabins, local restaurant, rural post office, and campgrounds adjacent to the Pacific Crest Trail. The Laguna Mountain Recreation Area surrounds the village, and the visitor's center for the pine-covered area is located here. The mountain backcountry of San Diego County is high enough to receive snowfall in winter months, and the Mount Laguna region offers locally-unique winter recreation in the form of snow play, sledding, and cross country skiing for several days after larger storms. The population was 74 at the 2020 census, up from 57 at the 2010 census.

The ZIP Code is 91948 and the community is inside area code 619.

Geography

Demographics
At the 2010 census Mount Laguna had a population of 57. The racial makeup of Mount Laguna was 55 (96.5%) White, 0 (0.0%) African American, 0 (0.0%) Native American, 1 (1.8%) Asian, 0 (0.0%) Pacific Islander, 1 (1.8%) from other races, and 0 (0.0%) from two or more races. Hispanic or Latino of any race were 1 people (1.8%).

The whole population lived in households, no one lived in non-institutionalized group quarters and no one was institutionalized.

There were 32 households, 3 (9.4%) had children under the age of 18 living in them, 15 (46.9%) were opposite-sex married couples living together, 0 (0%) had a female householder with no husband present, 1 (3.1%) had a male householder with no wife present.  There were 0 (0%) unmarried opposite-sex partnerships, and 0 (0%) same-sex married couples or partnerships. 15 households (46.9%) were one person and 9 (28.1%) had someone living alone who was 65 or older. The average household size was 1.78.  There were 16 families (50.0% of households); the average family size was 2.50.

The age distribution was 4 people (7.0%) under the age of 18, 4 people (7.0%) aged 18 to 24, 3 people (5.3%) aged 25 to 44, 21 people (36.8%) aged 45 to 64, and 25 people (43.9%) who were 65 or older.  The median age was 61.5 years. For every 100 females, there were 90.0 males.  For every 100 females age 18 and over, there were 96.3 males.

There were 167 housing units at an average density of 98.4 per square mile, of the occupied units 25 (78.1%) were owner-occupied and 7 (21.9%) were rented. The homeowner vacancy rate was 0%; the rental vacancy rate was 12.5%.  50 people (87.7% of the population) lived in owner-occupied housing units and 7 people (12.3%) lived in rental housing units.

Notes

References

Census-designated places in San Diego County, California
Laguna Mountains
Mountain Empire (San Diego County)
Census-designated places in California